was a professional Go player.

Biography 
Koyama became a 9 dan in 1971. He played in the Kansai Ki-in. His disciple was Yahata Koichi.

Titles 

1937 births
2000 deaths
Japanese Go players